The Crusader fortress of Krak des Chevaliers fell to the Mamluk sultan Baybars in 1271. 
Baybars went north to deal with Krak des Chevaliers after the death of Louis IX of France on 29 November 1270.

Siege and surrender 

After beating back the Mongols across the Euphrates, the Mamluk sultan Baybars was determined to oust the Crusaders from the Holy Land and bring it under Muslim Mamluk control. Before marching on the castle Baibars captured the smaller castles in the area, including Chastel Blanc. On 3 March 1271, Baibars' army arrived at Krak des Chevaliers. By the time the Sultan arrived the castle may already have been blockaded by Mamluk forces for several days. There are three Arabic accounts of the siege; only one, that of Ibn Shaddad, was by a contemporary although he was not present. Peasants who lived in the area had fled to the castle for safety and were kept in the outer ward. As soon as Baibars arrived he began erecting mangonels, powerful siege weapons which he would turn on the castle. According to Ibn Shaddad, two days later the first line of defences was captured by the besiegers; he was probably referring to a walled suburb outside the castle's entrance.

Rain interrupted the siege, but on 21 March a triangular outwork immediately south of Krak des Chevaliers, possibly defended by a timber palisade, was captured. On 29 March, the tower in the south-west corner was undermined and collapsed. Baibars' army attacked through the breach and on entering the outer ward where they encountered the peasants who had sought refuge in the castle.

Though the outer ward had fallen, and in the process a handful of the garrison killed, the Crusaders retreated to the more formidable inner ward. After a lull of ten days, the besiegers conveyed a letter to the garrison, supposedly from the Grand Master of the Knights Hospitaller in Tripoli which granted permission for them to surrender. Although the letter was a forgery, the garrison capitulated and the Sultan spared their lives. The new owners of the castle undertook repairs, focused mainly on the outer ward. The Hospitaller chapel was converted to a mosque and two mihrabs were added to the interior.

References

Works cited

 
 
 

Krak
Conflicts in 1271
13th century in the Mamluk Sultanate
Krak
Krak
Military history of the Crusader states after Lord Edward's crusade